John King (born 1901) was an English footballer who played in the Football League for Halifax Town and Leicester City.

References

1901 births
Year of death missing
English footballers
Association football forwards
English Football League players
Hinckley United F.C. players
Leicester City F.C. players
Halifax Town A.F.C. players
Nuneaton Borough F.C. players
Kidderminster Harriers F.C. players